Bang Goes the Budgie was an Australian children's television series that first aired on ABC in 1985 and was broadcast for several years until 1991.

The series ran for one season and 13 episodes and was a production of the Australian Children's Television Foundation and distributed by Richard Bence Productions Pty Ltd.

References

External links
Bang Goes the Budgie at AustLit (subscription required)
Bang Goes the Budget at TCMDB

Australian children's television series
1985 Australian television series debuts
1985 Australian television series endings
Australian Broadcasting Corporation original programming